The 1923 election for Mayor of Los Angeles took place on May 1, 1923. Incumbent George E. Cryer was re-elected over four challengers, which included former Councilman Bert L. Farmer and former Indiana Senator Edward E. Moore.

Municipal elections in California, including Mayor of Los Angeles, are officially nonpartisan; candidates' party affiliations do not appear on the ballot.

Election 
Incumbent George E. Cryer had been elected in 1921 over Meredith P. Snyder and was seeking re-election for a second term. He was challenged by former Councilman Bert L. Farmer and former Indiana Senator Edward E. Moore. In the election, Farmer campaigned for charter reform and said that he would "harmonize the various city departments." Cryer was very popular, being endorsed by the Los Angeles Times and the Municipal League, and won re-election in a landslide.

Results

References and footnotes

External links
 Office of the City Clerk, City of Los Angeles

1923
1923 California elections
Los Angeles
1920s in Los Angeles